Doxa Lefkadas B.C., or simply Doxa B.C., is a professional basketball club that is located on the island of Lefkada, in Lefkada City, Greece. The club currently plays in Greek basketball's 3rd-tier level Greek B Basket League.

History
The parent athletic club Doxa Lefkadas, was founded in 1981. The men's basketball team was then founded in 1982. The club first played in a national division in 1987, when it played in the 4th-tier level Greek C Basket League. The team won the 4th-tier Greek C Basket League in 2010, thus earning a promotion to the 3rd-tier level Greek B Basket League.

Doxa Lefkadas competed in the Greek Cup for the first time, in the 2010–11 season. For the 2011–12 season, Iraklis Thessaloniki declined its place in the 2nd-tier level Greek A2 Basket League, and Doxa Lefkadas replaced it in the league. For the 2012–13 season, the club finished in last place in the Greek A2 League, and was thus demoted back down to the 3rd-tier Greek B League.

In the 2013–14 season, Doxa Lefkadas won the North Group of the Greek B Basket League, and they were promoted back up to the Greek A2 League. In the 2015–16 season, the team finished in 6th place in the Greek A2 League.

For the 2016–17 season, the club was granted a wildcard to play in the top-tier level Greek Basket League for the first time.

Arena
Doxa Lefkadas plays their home games at the 1,200 seat Lefkada Indoor Hall. In 2016, the arena was upgraded, renovated, and more seating was added, in order to meet Greek Basket League standards.

Season by season

Roster

Notable players

  Georgios Apostolidis
  Vangelis Sklavos
  Alexis Kyritsis
  Andreas Kanonidis
  Dimitris Tsaldaris
  Sakis Karidas
  Stelios Ioannou
  Georgios Diamantopoulos
  Nikos Pettas
  Giannis Kyriakopoulos
  Ioannis Demertzis
  Ioannis Psathas
  Georgios Georgakis
  Christos Tapoutos
  Ivan Maraš
  David Doblas
  Justin Robinson
  Shannon Scott
  Melsahn Basabe
  Dez Wells
  Eli Carter
  Ty Abbott
  Alex Harris
  vasilis vagenas

Head coaches
  Makis Giatras: (2008–2009)
  Dimitris Papadopoulos: (2012–2013)
  Vangelis Ziagkos: (2014–2015)
  Charis Markopoulos: (2016–2017)

References

External links
Doxa Lefkadas B.C. Website 
Eurobasket.com Team Page

Basketball teams in Greece
Basketball teams established in 1982
1982 establishments in Greece